Aba Amuquandoh (born 1994-1996) is a Canadian actress and comedian, best known for her work on the sketch comedy series This Hour Has 22 Minutes. She first joined the show in the 2020 season, both as a writer and as a supporting performer in sketches, and was promoted to a starring member in the 2021–22 season.

From Toronto, Ontario, she has previously been associated with The Sketchersons and with The Second City's FamCo troupe for children's and family shows. She is also a partner with Coko Galore, PHATT Al, Alan Shane Lewis, Nkasi Ogbonnah, Ajahnis Charley, Brandon Ash-Mohammed and Brandon Hackett in Untitled Black Sketch Project, Canada's first all-Black Canadian sketch comedy troupe.

In 2020, Amuquandoh performed on FreeUp! The Emancipation Day Special. Beginning in 2022, she has also been the host of the reality competition series Best in Miniature.

References

21st-century Canadian actresses
21st-century Canadian comedians
Canadian television actresses
Canadian sketch comedians
Canadian women comedians
Black Canadian actresses
Black Canadian comedians
Actresses from Toronto
Comedians from Toronto
This Hour Has 22 Minutes
Living people
1994 births
Black Canadian broadcasters
Canadian television hosts